Nick Jordan is a visual artist and experimental filmmaker based in Manchester, UK. Jordan's work has been shown widely at international exhibitions and film festivals, including Innsbruck International Biennale (Austria); ICA (London); Kunstmuseum (Bonn); Musée du quai Branly (Paris); Whitstable Biennale; BFI London Film Festival; Encounters Short Film and Animation Festival; Edinburgh International Film Festival (EIFF); Portland International Film Festival; Haus der Kulturen (Berlin); State Darwin Museum (Moscow); Clermont-Ferrand International Short Film Festival; São Paulo International Short Film Festival (Brazil); Kassel Dokfest (Germany); Documenta (Madrid). Nick Jordan also works in a collaborative practice with fellow artist Jacob Cartwright, see Jacob Cartwright and Nick Jordan.

The artist's practice is cross-disciplinary, encompassing film, drawing, prints, painting, photography, sculptural objects, publications and collaboration, and explores the relationship between the natural world and social or cultural histories.

Nick Jordan is the co-director of Between Two Rivers (2012) – a feature-length documentary about the town of Cairo, Illinois. The film was awarded Best Film at Big Muddy Film Festival (2012) and River's Edge International Film Festival (2012)

In 2017, Nick Jordan co-directed a mid-length feature documentary, Intentional Community, made in collaboration with artist Clara Casian. The film is a portrait of Braziers Park School of Integrative Social Research.

The artist's publications include Alien Invaders, published by Book Works, which takes the form of a guidebook to non-native species found in Britain, and the effects on native wildlife.

Other publications include Some Mild Peril (Castlefield Gallery, 2004);The Audubon Trilogy (Dedecus, 2010), a chapbook and series of short films drawn from the writings of 19th-century artist and frontiersman John James Audubon, following his escapades along the Ohio river and Mississippi river; and Heaven, Hell and Other Places, a documentary on Emanuel Swedenborg, commissioned by The Swedenborg Society.

Artist residences & commissioned projects include Headlands Center for the Arts, (San Francisco, USA); Thackray Museum of Medicine (UK); Arts & Heritage (UK); The National Trust (UK); The Manchester Museum, (UK); Book Works (London); LOCWS Art Across the City (Swansea); ICA (London); Art Gene (UK); British Society of Aesthetics (UK); North Yorkshire Public Archives (UK); Newcastle University (UK) / Stasi Archives (Germany).

Filmography
(C&J = Cartwright & Jordan)
The Entangled Forest, 2023
Genetic Sequences, 2022
The Open Secret, 2022 (C&J)
Swalesong, 2022 (C&J)
Mushroom Hunting in the Woods, 2022
The Unofficial Countryside, 2021 (C&J)
The Wild Enclosed, 2021 (C&J)
The Language of Hands, 2021
Rare Frequencies, 2020
Welcome to Metropolis, 2020 (C&J)
Natural Hosts, 2020
Wurstundgritzmitbrutti, 2020
Concrete Forms of Resistance, 2019
Kobbwebjar, 2018
Stratum, 2018 (C&J)
STRATA, 2018 (C&J)
Intentional Community: The Art of Living & the Science of Life, 2017 (co-director Clara Casian)
Thought Broadcasting, 2017
MERZMONGO, 2016
Last Acre, 2016 (C&J)
The Atom Station, 2015
The Emotions of Others, 2015 (C&J)
Off the Trail, 2015 (C&J)
Headlands Lookout, 2014 (C&J)
The Rising, 2014
Nature House Inc., 2013
Between Two Rivers, 2012 (C&J)
American Water, 2011 (C&J)
Monument to Swedenborg, 2010 (C&J)
Heaven, Hell and Other Places, 2010 (C&J)
Confluence, 2010 (C&J)
How the air feels to the birds, 2009
The Reapers, 2009 (C&J)
Cairo, 2009 (C&J)
West Point, 2008 (C&J)
New Madrid, 2008 (C&J)
How The Cutter Works, 2008
Eight Themes for the Golden Record, 2008 (C&J)
Norwegian Wood (This Bird Has Flown), 2007
Descriptions & Sketches of Some Remarkable Oaks, 2007 (C&J)
Let the user speak next, 2006
Prequel, 2006
William Carlos Williams, 2005
Edgar, 2005 (C&J)
Havanazephyr, 2005
Grubber, 2004 (C&J)
12 Dogs, 2004
Notes on the Cinematograph, 2004
Highwater Everywhere Part 2, 2003
Fury, 2003
Hank Williams Setting The Woods On Fire, 2003
Another Road Movie, 2003
A Road Movie, 2003
Roused By My Epilepsy, 2003
Transistor Man, 2003

Notes

External links
Artist's homepage
Nick Jordan interview, Clermont-Ferrand Int. Short Film Festival, 2017
Nick Jordan interview, Clermont-Ferrand Int. Short Film Festival, 2016
Nick Jordan interview, Aesthetica
BFI: great shorts from around the world
Introducing Nick Jordan, Art Across the City
Headlands Artists-in-Residence
Between Two Rivers
Book Works

Alchemy fellowship
Vimeo page

English contemporary artists
British video artists
English film directors
21st-century English painters
English male painters
1967 births
Living people
21st-century English male artists